Mayu Pasupati (born 5 December 1976) is a cricketer originally from Sri Lanka but who played cricket in New Zealand. A fast-medium bowler, he has played for Wellington and Auckland. He made his first-class debut for Auckland in 1997/98 against Otago. His List-A debut for Auckland came in 1998/99 also against Otago. His Twenty20 debut for Auckland came on 20 January 2006 against Northern Districts. He has also played for Wellington City in the Hawke Cup.  He was well known for his acrobatic catches and big-hitting style.

In the 2002 State Shield one-day final, which Wellington won, Pasupati caught Aaron Redmond out off the bowling of Mark Jefferson. His one-handed take in the outfield was memorable enough to be reported, 15 years later, as "one of the best catches seen on New Zealand soil".

See also
 List of Auckland representative cricketers

References

External links
Cricinfo Profile

1976 births
Living people
New Zealand cricketers
Auckland cricketers
Wellington cricketers
New Zealand people of Sri Lankan Tamil descent